Aiysha Saagar (born 6 January 1980) is an Australian pop singer. She completed her studies in Accounting, Law and Financial Planning. She started her career as a glamour model. In 2012 she became an official Brand Ambassador of Australia's Gold Coast. In mid-2012, Aiysha created controversy by posing topless while being the Gold Coast, Australia's brand ambassador. Some Indian-Australian community members felt that Aiysha's topless photo shoot reflect badly on Indians.

Aiysha has released a number of albums so far, and has worked with Himesh Reshammiya for Arzoo Arzoo music album in 2012.

Albums

References

External links

 
 

1980 births
Living people
People from the Gold Coast, Queensland
Australian women pop singers
Musicians from Gold Coast, Queensland
21st-century Australian singers
21st-century Australian women singers